Grosvenor Gardens House is a Grade II-listed mansion block at 23–47 Grosvenor Gardens, Belgravia, London. Queen Elizabeth The Queen Mother may have been born there in 1900. David Niven was born there in 1910, and William Henry Blackmore killed himself there in 1878. As of March 2017, the building is the subject of a £132-million High Court trial for damages brought against Christian and Nick Candy.

History
Grosvenor Gardens House was built in about 1868 by the architect Thomas Cundy III in the French Renaissance style. It was originally called Belgrave Mansions, and when it was finished in 1868, it was London's first serviced apartment block. It was converted into a hotel in the 1920s, and then into offices in the 1930s.

In 1878, William Henry Blackmore (1827–1878), killed himself in his study at Belgrave Mansions.

In 2011, the  full street block was purchased by Oakvest, and in 2013 Westminster City Council granted planning permission for conversion into 42 luxury flats, subject to a £7.1 million financial contribution to the Council's affordable housing fund.

Notable residents

Queen Elizabeth The Queen Mother's 1900 birthplace remains uncertain, and Belgrave Mansions is one of the leading contenders, in a flat rented by her paternal grandparents and which her parents Lord Glamis and Lady Glamis stayed in when in London.

Notable residents have included the actor David Niven, who was born there in 1910, as well as William Adolph Baillie-Grohman, the Austrian adventurer, writer and big game hunter.

Lieutenant General Sir Lewis Pelly (1825–1892), the army officer and member of Parliament, lived there.

Court case
As of March 2017, the building is at the centre of a £132-million High Court trial for damages brought against Christian and Nick Candy by the entrepreneur Mark Holyoake.

References

External links

Belgravia
Apartment buildings in London
Grade II listed buildings in the City of Westminster